The 2018–19 Seattle Redhawks women's basketball team represents Seattle University during the 2018–19 NCAA Division I women's basketball season. The Redhawks, led by third year head coach Suzy Barcomb, play their home games at the Redhawk Center and were members of the Western Athletic Conference. They finished the season 3–27, 3–13 in WAC play to finish in eighth place. They lost in the quarterfinals of the WAC women's tournament to Texas–Rio Grande Valley.

Roster

Schedule

|-
!colspan=9 style=| Exhibition

|-
!colspan=9 style=| Non-conference regular season

|-
!colspan=9 style=| WAC regular season

|-
!colspan=9 style=| WAC Women's Tournament

See also
2018–19 Seattle Redhawks men's basketball team

References

Seattle Redhawks women's basketball seasons
Seattle
Seattle Redhawks
Seattle Redhawks